Malaysia competed in the 2010 Commonwealth Games held in Delhi, India, from 3 to 14 October 2010. Malaysia's team consisted of 203 athletes and 99 officials throughout the Games. Malaysia won 12 gold medals, surpassing the 10-gold medal target set by the National Sports Council, and finished in 7th position in the medal table.

Medal summary

Medallist
The following Malaysian competitors won medals at the games; all dates are for October 2010.

Archery

Recurve

Compound

Athletics

Men
Track and road events

Field event

Women
Field event

Key
 Note–Ranks given for track events are within the athlete's heat only
 Q = Qualified for the next round
 q = Qualified for the next round as a fastest loser or, in field events, by position without achieving the qualifying target
 NR = National record
 N/A = Round not applicable for the event
 Bye = Athlete not required to compete in round

Badminton

Malaysia's Badminton consist of 11 athletes for the 2010 Commonwealth Games . The team won 4 gold medals which were the mixed team and doubles event along with the men's singles and doubles event. They surpassed the 3 gold medal target set by the national sport council.

Individual

Doubles

Team

Boxing

Men

Cycling

Road

Track
Sprint

Pursuit

Time trial

Points race

Scratch race

Keirin

Diving

Men

Women

Gymnastics

Artistic

Men

Women

Rhythmic

Hockey

Men's tournament

Roster

 Roslan Jamaluddin (GK)
 Baljit Singh Charun Singh
 Hafifihafiz Hanafi
 Izwan Firdaus Ahmad Tajuddin
 Muhamad Amin Rahim
 Muhamad Marhan Mohd Jalil
 Faizal Saari
 Jiwa Mohan
 Mohd Madzli Mohd Nor (C)
 Tengku Ahmad Tajuddin Tengku Abdul Jalil
 Nabil Fiqri Mohd Noor
 Mohamad Sukri Abdul Mutalib
 Muhammad Razie Abd Rahim
 Azlan Misron
 Mohd Shahrun Nabil Abdullah
 Kumar Subramaniam (GK)

Pool A

Seventh and eighth place match

Ranked 8th in final standings

Women's tournament

Roster

 Farah Ayuni Yahya (GK)
 Fazilla Sylvester Silin
 Siti Rahmah Othman
 Sebah Kari
 Noor Hasliza Md Ali
 Rabiatul Adawiyah Mohamed
 Siti Noor Amarina Ruhani
 Juliani Mohamad Din
 Norfaraha Hashim
 Catherine Lambor
 Norhasikin Halim
 Norazlin Sumantri
 Nuraini Abdul Rashid
 Nadia Abdul Rahman (C)
 Norbaini Hashim
 Siti Noor Hafiza Zainordin (GK)

Pool B

Ninth and tenth place match

Ranked 10th in final standings

Lawn bowls

Men

Women

Rugby sevens

Men's tournament
Malaysia has qualified a rugby sevens team.

Roster

 Dinesvaran Knznnan
 Mohd Hafiizh Zainal
 Mohamad Amin Jamaluddin
 Mohd Khairul Fakri
 Mohd Mohsin Abdullah
 Mohd Saizul Hafis Md Noor
 Mohd Khairol Azhar Md Noor
 Mohd Syahir Asraf Rosli
 Mohamad Nazeer Mohamed Nesharah
 Mohd Faizul Abdul Rahman
 Mohd Saizul Hafifi Md Noor

Pool C

Bowl
Quarterfinal

Ranked 12th in final standings

Shooting

Men
Pistol/Small bore

Shotgun

Full bore

Women
Pistol/Small bore

Squash

Individual

Doubles

Swimming

Men

Women

Synchronized swimming

Table tennis

Singles

Doubles

Team

Weightlifting

Men

Women

Powerlifting

References

Nations at the 2010 Commonwealth Games
Malaysia at the Commonwealth Games
2010 in Malaysian sport